Ysaline Bonaventure and Ekaterine Gorgodze were the defending champions, but Bonaventure chose not to participate. Gorgodze partnered Irina Bara but lost in the semifinals to eventual champions Aliona Bolsova and Rebeka Masarova.

Bolsova and Masarova won the title, defeating Alexandra Panova and Arantxa Rus 6–0, 6–3 in the final.

Seeds

Draw

Draw

References

External links
 Draw

BBVA Open Internacional de Valencia - Doubles